The Roman Catholic Archdiocese of Mount Hagen is  a Metropolitan Archdiocese in Papua New Guinea.  It is responsible for the suffragan dioceses of Goroka, Kundiawa, Mendi and Wabag.

Bishops

Archbishops of Mount Hagen
 George Elmer Bernarding, S.V.D. (1959-1987) 
 Michael Meier, S.V.D. (1987-2006)
 Douglas William Young, S.V.D. (2006- )

Coadjutor archbishop
Michael Meier, S.V.D. (1984-1987)

Auxiliary bishop
Douglas William Young, S.V.D. (2000-2006), appointed Archbishop here

External links and references
 

A